Guzmania sphaeroidea is a species of flowering plant in the Bromeliaceae family. It is native to Bolivia, Guyana, Peru, Panama, Colombia, Venezuela and Ecuador.

References

sphaeroidea
Flora of Panama
Flora of South America
Plants described in 1888
Taxa named by Carl Christian Mez
Taxa named by Édouard André